Ådalsfjella  is a mountain range in southern Norway. It consist of a series of smaller peaks and mountains located within Ringerike in Buskerud county. Ådalsfjella is a small mountain range which stretches from within Vestre Ådal in Ådal to Vassfaret bordering Sør-Aurdal in Oppland.  The mountain range lies between Lake Sperillen to the east and the valley of Soknedalen to the west.

See also
Urdevassfjell

References

Mountain ranges of Norway
Mountains of Viken